Psi Pegasi, which is Latinized from ψ Pegasi, is a binary star system within the great square in the northern constellation of Pegasus. It has a red hue and is faintly visible to the naked eye with an apparent visual magnitude of 4.66. This object is located at a distance of approximately 476 light-years away from the Sun based on parallax, but is drifting closer with a radial velocity of −6.6 km/s.

The orbital elements for this system were computed for the first time in 2004 based on interferometric observations, yielding an orbital period of roughly 55 years and an eccentricity of about 0.19. The visible component is an aging red giant star on the asymptotic giant branch with a stellar classification of M3III. It is a suspected variable, probably semiregular, with its magnitude varying from 4.63 to 4.69 over periods of 37.4 and 118.9 days. With the supply of hydrogen exhausted at its core, the star has cooled and expanded to around 98 times the Sun's radius.

References

M-type giants
Suspected variables
Semiregular variable stars
Binary stars
Double stars

Pegasus (constellation)
Pegasi, Psi
BD+24 4865
Pegasi, 84
224427
118131
9064